Anatomi is a  luxury fashion brand based in Dubai, United Arab Emirates.

Brand
Anatomi is a  luxury fashion brand based in Dubai which was launched by Doaa Alghouti in 2015. She studied Interior Architecture before changing her career to fashion.

Anatomi showcased its first Fall/Winter 18 collection within the official Paris Fashion Week schedules in March 2018 and also showcased its Spring/Summer 19 and Spring/Summer 20 within the New York Fashion Week scheduled in September 2018 and September 2019.

References

External links
Official Website
OneFamShop Site
Anatomi on Instagram

High fashion brands
Companies based in Dubai
Clothing brands
Emirati companies established in 2015
Clothing companies established in 2015